The 28th B.A.R.C. "200" meeting, saw the 13th running of the P&O Ferries sponsored Jochen Rindt Memorial Trophy. This was the third round of the 1984 European Championship for F2 Drivers, and held at Thruxton Circuit, in Hampshire, on 23 April.

Report

Entry 
A total of 20 F2 cars were entered for the event, but come qualifying two of these did not arrive in Hampshire.

Qualifying 

Race 
The race was held over 55 laps of the Thruxton circuit. Mike Thackwell took the winner spoils for works Ralt team, driving their Ralt-Honda RH6. Just over 21 seconds behind was the Cheylesmore/BS Automotive March of Christian Danner. The third different car in the top three was the AGS-BMW JH19C of Philippe Streiff.

Classification

Race Result 

 Fastest lap: Mike Thackwell, 1:07.38mins.

References 

Jochen Rindt
Jochen Rindt